Dudovica is a small town in the Lazarevac municipality in the Belgrade District of Serbia. It was seat of a municipality abolished in the 1960s and added to the municipality of Lazarevac.

Demographics

According to the 2011 census results, the village has 701 inhabitants.

Ethnic groups
The ethnic composition of the village (as of 2002 census):
 Serbs: 769 - 98,97%
 Yugoslavs: 4 - 0,51%
 Montenegrins: 3 - 0,38%
 Romanians: 1 - 0,12%
 Unknown: 0 - 0,0%

Economy

Dudovica is known as the breeding area of the mangalica pigs.

History
19 people from Dudovica were killed in the Jasenovac Camp in the World War II. All were ethnic Serbs.

References

External links

Satellite map at Maplandia.com

Suburbs of Belgrade
Šumadija
Lazarevac